The following is a list of original programs created for National Geographic, for either The National Geographic Channel, Nat Geo Wild, or Disney+.

2023 

Titanic: 25 Years Later with James Cameron

2022

2021

2020

2019

2018

2017

2016

2015

2014

2013

2012

2011

2010

2009

2008

2007

2006

2005

2004

2003

2002

2001

1997

1984

Series

Coming Soon

2023

2022

2021

2020

2019

2018

2017

2016

2015

2014

2013

2012

2011

2010

2009

2008

2007

2006

2004

2003

Other programs 

 Black Bear Unleashed
 The Black Dragon
 Blackbeard: Terror at Sea
 Blinding Horizon
 Blowdown
 Bob Ballard Specials
 Body Snatchers of Bangkok
 Bomb Onboard
 The Bombing of Germany
 The Border
Borrowed Time
 Boxing Behind Bars
 Brain Child
 Breakout (American TV program)|Breakout
 Brilliant Beasts
 Britain's Greatest Machines with Chris Barrie
 Britain's Underworld
 Bruce Lee: The Legend
 Bruce Lee Lives!
 Building Wild
 Built For Destruction
 Built For The Kill
 Burying King Tut
 Butchering Beauty (aka Trading Faces)
 The Butterfly Code
 Cain and Abel: Brothers at War
 Cameramen Who Dare
 Carrier
 Cars
 Catacombs Of Palermo
 Catching a Crook
 Catching Giants
 Caught Barehanded
 Caught In The Act
 Caught on Safari: Battle at Kruger
 Chasing Earthquakes
 Chasing UFOs
 Cheetah: Against All Odds
 Chef On The Road
 China Circus
 China Quake
 China's Ghost Army
 China's Great Wall
 China's Mystery Mummies
 The Chinese Hajj
 Churchill's German Army
 City Of Ants
 Civil War
 City So Real
 Civil War Gold
 Clash Of The Continent
 Classified: CIA Confidential
 Climbing Redwood Giants
 A Closer Shave
 Cockroach Confidential
 Colombia's Gold War
 Colorado Cannibal
 Conjoined at the Head
 Continent 7: Antarctica
 Convoy: War For The Atlantic
 Cooking The World
 Cradle of Mandopop
 Crash Science
 Crime Scene Bangkok
 Crimes Against Nature
 Critical Situation
 Cross Of Katuma
 Crowd Control (TV series)|Crowd Control
 Cruise Ship Diaries
 Crystal Skull Legend
 CUE TONE
 D-Day:Men And Machines
 Danger Men
 Dangerous Encounters
 Dangerous Encounters with Brady Barr
 Dangerous Jobs (a.k.a. Cheating Death)
 Deadly Arts
 Death of The Universe
 Death Traps
 Deep Jungle
 Deepest Dive
 Deepsea Under The Pole
 Delhi In Flames
 Demolition Dynasty
 Desert Seas
 Diaries From Hell
 Dino Death Trap
 Dinofish
 Disaster Earth
 Divine Delinquents
 Diving The Labyrinth
 The Diving Women Of Jeju
 Dogfight Over Guadalcanal 
 Dogfight Over MIG Alley 
 Dog Whisperer
 DogTown
 Don't Tell My Mother
 Doomsday Preppers
 Dragon Chronicles
 Drain the Alcatraz
 Drain the Bermuda Triangle
 Drain the Great Lakes
 Drain the Ocean: Deep Sea Mysteries
 Drain the Sunken Pirate City
 Drain the Titanic
 Drain the Ocean: WWII
 Driving America
 Driving Dreams
 Dubai Mega Mall
 The Earth
 Earth 2007
 Earth Hour
 Earth: Making of a Planet
 Earth Overhaul
 Earth: The Power of the Planet
 Earth Shocks
 Eat: The Story of Food
 Ebola
 Egypt Underworld
 The Egyptian Job
 Empire War
 End Day
 Engineering Connections
 Escape Factory
 Evacuate Earth
 Every Singaporean Son*
 Expedition Antarctica
 Expedition Great White
 Expedition Wild
 Exploding Las Vegas
 Explorations (TV series)|Explorations
 Extraordinary Dogs
 Extraterrestrial (TV program)|Extraterrestrial
 Extreme Engineering
 Extreme Expeditions
 Extreme Ice
 Extreme Powerboats
 Extreme Speed
 Eye of the Leopard
 Facing (documentary series)|Facing
 Faking China
 Family Guns
 Fight Masters
 Fight Science
 The Final Report
 Finding Atlantis
 Finding The Lost Da Vinci
 Finding The Next Earth
 Fish Warrior
 Fishzilla: Snakehead Invasion
 Flight of the Elephants
 Florence Unlocked
 Flushed
 Food Lovers Guide to the Planet
 Food School
 Forbidden Tomb Of Genghis Khan
 Forensic First
 Freemasons On Trial
 Frequently Asked Questions
 Garbage Moguls
 Garbage Mountain
 General At War
 Genius
 Geologic Journey
 George W. Bush: The 9/11 Interview
 Ghost Ship of the Great Lakes
 Ghost Ship Resurrection
 Golden Baboons
 Gorilla Murder
 The Great Indian Witchhunt
 Great Migrations
 The Great Serengeti
 Ground War
 Guardians Of Angkor
 Hard Time
 Hawaii: Rivers Of Fire
 I Came Away Alive
 I Came Back From the Dead
 I Didn't Know That
 I Fell from the Sky
 I Was Buried Alive
 I Was Struck by Lightning
 I Was Superhuman
 Impossible Bridges
 In the Womb
 The Incredible Dr. Pol
 Incredible Human Machine
 The Indestructibles
 Indy Motor Speedway
 Insects From Hell
 Inside 9/11
 Inside the Green Berets
 Inside Hurricane Katrina
 Inside the Mafia
 Inside Magic
 Inside Nature's Giants
 Inside SERIES
 Interpol Investigates
 Into The Crystal Cave
 Into Iceland's Volcano
 iPredator
 Is It Real?
 Islands
 Jack Johnson: Kokua Concert
 James Cameron
 Japan Tsunami: How It Happened
 Japanese Cowboy
 Japan's Hidden Secret
 Japan's Secret Weapon
 Jean-Michel Cousteau-Ocean Ad
 Jeju, Island Of A Thousand Face
 Jellyfish Invasion
 JFK: The Lost Bullet
 Journey to the Edge of the Universe
 Journey To Europa
 Kenny And Zoltan's Venom Quest
 Kick Fighters
 Killing Hitler
 Killing Kennedy (film)|Killing Kennedy
 Killing Lincoln (film)|Killing Lincoln
 Kimchi Chronicles
 King Tut's Curse
 Knights of Mayhem
 The Known Earth
 Known Universe
 Korean Soul Food
 Koxing
 The Kung Fu Dragons Of Wudang
 Kung Fu Killers
 Kung Fu Monk
 Kung Fu Quest
 LA Street Racers
 Laden's Spy In America
 The Last Days of Osama Bin Laden
 Last Man Standing: The Human Race
 Last Secrets of The Third Reich 
 Last War Heroes
 A Leader's Legacy
 Let it Ride
 Lewis & Clark: Great Journey West
 Light The Ocean
 Lightning Reloaded
 Lions Behaving Badly** 
 Liquid Bomb Plot
 Live Free or Die (television series)|Live Do or Die
 Live Like An Animal
 The Living Edens
 Lockdown (2006 TV series)
 Banged Up Abroad|Locked Up Abroad
 Lonely Planet
 Lonely Planet: Roads Less Travelled
 Long Way Down
 The Lost City
 Lost Continent of the Pacific
 Lost in China
 Lost World
 Lucky Muckers
 Machines Of War
 Mad Labs]]
 The Mafia
 Make ME Superhuman
 Malaysian Journey with Jason Scott Lee
 Man Hunt
 Man-Made
 Man vs. Monster
 Maneater Manhunt
 Manta Mystery (a.k.a. Project Manta)
 Mars (2016 TV series)|Mars
 Marco Polo: The China Mystery Revealed
 Mars (miniseries)|Mars
 Medieval Fightbook
 Meet The Natives
 Mega Factories
 Mega Mosque
 The Megafalls Of Iguacu
 Megafamilies
 Megafish
 Megaship
 MegaStructures
 MegaStructures Break Down
 The Meadow (play)|The Meadow
 The Memory Masters
 Mengele's Twins
 Million Dollar Moon Rock Heist
 Monkey Thieves
 Monster Crocs**
 Monster Fish Of The Congo
 Monster Moves
 More Amazing Moments
 More Weddings And Another Funeral
 Mother Warthog**
 Mumbai Mega Flood
 Mummy Road Show
 Murder Dolls
 Mystery 360
 Mystery Files (British TV series)|Mystery Files
 Mystery Gorillas & Search for the Great Apes
 Mystery of the Neanderthals: On Assignment
 Mysteries Of The Moose**
 My Brilliant Brain
 My Dog Ate What?
 Naked Earth
 Naked Science
 Narco Bling
 Narrow Escapes of WWII 
 Nat Geo's Top 10 Photos
 National Geographic: Frontline Diaries
 National Geographic's Most Amazing Moments
 National Geographic's Most Amazing Photos
 National Geographic's Most Astonishing Moments
 National Geographic's Most Astounding Moments
 National Geographic's Most Dangerous Moments
 National Geographic's Most Daring Moments
 National Geographic's Most Extreme Moments
 National Geographic's Most Outrageous Moments
 National Geographic's Most Shocking Moments
 National Geographic's Most Thrilling Moments
 Nazi Death Squads
 Nazi Megastructures
 Nazi Scrapbooks From Hell
 Need for Speed: Bikes
 Need for Speed: Boats
 Nefertiti's Odyssey
 Night of the Lion
 Night Shift
 No Man Left Behind
 Nomads
 Nordic Wild
 The Numbers Game
 One Ocean
 Orca Killing School
 Outbreak Investigation
 Paranatural
 Paranormal?
 Party Like
 Perfect Swarm
 Perfect Weapon (TV series)|Perfect Weapon
 Perilous Journeys
 Phobia
 The Pigeon Game
 Pirate Patrol
 Planes
 Planet Carnivore
 Planet Mechanics
 Plastiki
 Pompeii Uncovered
 The Power Game - Chiang Kai-Shek And His Families
 Python Hunters
 Quest For The Megafish Of The Amazon
 Rape Of Europa
 Rebuilding The Titanic
 Redwoods: Anatomy Of A Giant
 Reign Of Terror
 Rescue Emergency
 Restrepo
 Return to Titanic
 Reverse Exploration
 Riddle of the Romanovs
 Riddles of The Dead
 The Rise Of Black Wolf 
 Rivers And Life*
 Road To The London Olympics
 Roads
 Rock Stars
 Rocket City Rednecks
 Roman Homicide
 Sailing The Treasure Ship 
 Salmon Wars
 Salt Flat Speedway
 Salvage Code Red
 Samurai Bow
 Samurai Spider
 Savannah (TV series)
 Save the Titanic with Bob Ballard
 Saved by the Lioness
 Saxon Gold
 Scam City
 Science of Brick
 Science of Concrete
 Science of Interrogation
 Sea Patrol
 Sea Strikers
 Seahorses: Wanted Dead Or Alive
 Search For The Amazon Headshrinkers
 Search For The Bushmen
 Search For The Cannibals of The South Pacific
 Search For The First Dog: A Quest To Find Our Original Best Friend
 Search For The Giant Octopus
 Search for the Living Cannibals
 Search for the Submarine I-52
 Seconds From Disaster
 Secret Bible
 The Secret Heart
 Secret Shark Pits
 Secrets of The 10 Plagues
 Secrets of the Cross
 Secrets of the First Emperor
 Secrets of the King Cobra
 Secrets of the Parthenon
 Secrets of the Snow Ship
 Secrets of Taj Mahal
 Secrets of the Tang Treasure Ship
 Secrets of the Viking Warriors
 Seoul: Unlocking The Grid
 Seoul's Got Soul
 Sex and the Brain
 The Scrap House
 Shark Men
 Sharks of Lost Island
 Showreal Asia*
 Sinking of The Belgrano
 Situation Critical
 Six Degrees Could Change the World
 Skin
 Sky Monsters
 Slammed: Inside Indie Wrestling
 Sleeping Beauties
 Somewhere In China
 Space Crab
 Space Mysteries
 Speed Nation
 Spider Deadly Love
 Spine Chillers
 Spirit Talk
 Stalking Hitler's Generals
 Stonehenge Decoded
 Street Genius
 Strictly Asian Ballroom
 Sudden Death
 Sumatra's Last Tiger
 Sumo Kids
 Super Cyclone
 Super Flu
 Super Port
 Supercarrier: USS Ronald Reagan
 Supercell
 SuperCroc
 Superfish
 Superhuman
 Survive the Tribe
 Surviving the Super Twisters
 Stalking Hitler's Generals
 Storm Stories
 Storm Worlds
 Street Food Around The World
 Street Heat
 Stuntmen of Bollywood
 Swamp Troop
 Taboo (2002 TV series)|Taboo
 Taiwan Medical Miracle*
 Taiwan To The World*
 Taiwan Wild*
 Taming The Four Rivers
 Templars: The Last Stand
 Test Your Brain
 That Shouldn't Fly
 The '80s: The Decade that Made Us
 The '90s: The Last Great Decade?(also entitled The '90s: The Decade that Connected Us)
 The 2000s: The Decade We Saw It All
 The Long Road Home (miniseries)|The Long Road Home
 Through Their Eyes
 Tiger Man
 Titanic: 20 Years Later with James Cameron
 Titanic: The Final Word with James Cameron
 To Be Assigned
 The Toilet Men
 Tokyo Shock Boys
 Tomb Raptor
 Top 20 Asian Marvels
 RiffTrax|Total Riff Off
 Totally Wild
 Training for the Apocalypse
 Trains
 Trapped (National Geographic Channel)|Trapped
 A Traveler's Guide to the Planets
 Travelogue
 Trekking the Great Wall
 Trekking Malaysia With Jason Scott Lee
 T-Rex Walks Again
 The Truth Behind
 The Truth Behind Zombies
 Truth Files
 Tsunami Line
 Tuna Cowboys
 The Two Million Year Old Boy 
 Typhoon Hunters
 UFOs
 Ultimate Airport Dubai
 Ultimate Disaster
 National Geographic Ultimate Explorer|Ultimate Explorer
 Ultimate Factories
 The Untold Truth About Supermokh
 Valley of the Boom
 Vatican
 War Secrets
 Warplanes
 Warrior Bees
 Warrior Graveyard
 Warzone Gone Wild
 What Would Happen If
 When Continents Collide
 When Crocs Ate Dinosaurs
 When Rome Ruled
 Who Knew?
 Who Sank The Bismarck
 Wicked Pirate City
 Wild (TV series
 Wild Amazon
 Wild Case Files
 Wild Japan
 Wild Russia (in co-production with S4C and ZDF)
 Wild Sex
 The Witch Doctor Will See You Now
 Witness
 Witness 9/11
 Witness Disaster
 Womb Of The World
 Word Travels
 World's Creepiest Killers
 World's Deadliest Animals
 The World's Oldest Child
 World's Tallest Bridge
 World's Toughest Fixes
 World's Worst Natural Disasters
 World's Worst Weather
 X-Ray Earth
 Year of the Storm
 Year Million
 Yukon River Run

Notes

* Only on NGC Asia, ** Nat Geo HD

References

National Geographic Channel